The mountain redbelly dace (Chrosomus oreas)  is a species of ray-finned fish in the genus Chrosomus. It is found in mountain and Piedmont regions of the Atlantic slope of North America from the Shenandoah River in Virginia, to the Neuse River drainage in North Carolina and the upper New River drainage in West Virginia, Virginia, and North Carolina.

References

Chrosomus
Freshwater fish of the United States
Fish described in 1868
Taxa named by Edward Drinker Cope